Abdul Samad Ghaus  (1928 – 2008?) was deputy foreign minister of Afghanistan in Mohammed Daoud Khan's Republic of Afghanistan. He was the most senior official of the Afghan Foreign Ministry to survive the communist coup in April 1978. After house arrest, he was imprisoned in 1980. He came to United States in 1981 and authored "The Fall of Afghanistan: an insider's account" in 1988, where he recounts detailed events leading to assassination of the president Mohammed Daoud Khan and fall of Republic of Afghanistan. 

Mr. Ghaus was born in Kabul. He completed high school in Kabul, and continued his education in France and Switzerland, graduating from University of Geneva in 1956 with equivalent of MA in political science and international affairs. He served as director of United Nations and International Conferences Department of political affairs in 1973, director general of political affairs in 1976 and finally deputy foreign minister in 1977. He was intimately involved in all major aspects of Afghan foreign policy, including top-level talks with Soviet Union, United States and Pakistan. It was his friendship with Mr. Theodore L Eliot Jr, United States Ambassador to Afghanistan in 1973, that helped secure funding to author the book on Afghanistan.

References 

Afghan politicians
Democratic Republic of Afghanistan
1928 births

2008 deaths
Year of death uncertain